The Lantian Formation is a 150-meter-thick sequence of rocks deposited in southern China during a 90-million-year epoch in the Ediacaran period.  Its algal macrofossils (which have alternatively been interpreted as putative metazoans) are the oldest large and complex fossils known.

Sedimentology 
The rocks were deposited in shallow seas, in the photic zone yet below storm wave base, yet were deposited in predominantly anoxic conditions.  The fossils are located on the bedding planes, and are randomly oriented.

The lowest part of the formation consists of a cap dolomite, marking the end of the Marinoan glaciation and start of the Ediacaran.  Above this is black shale containing the Lantian biota fossils.  Above this are layers of dolomite, and shale followed by limestone.  The highest part of the formation is black shale again.  Above the formation is the Piyuancun formation consisting of silicious rock.  The Lantian formation overlies diamictite from the Cryogenian.

Taphonomy 
The fossils are preserved as carbonaceous films in a Burgess Shale type preservational fashion. Anhuiphyton lineatum is one example of a fossil located in the site.

Age 
Originally presumed to be Cambrian in age, the formation is now correlated with the Doushantuo formation, with an overlying formation also falling in the Ediacaran period.

References 

Ediacaran Asia
Ediacaran life
Ediacaran geology
Proterozoic Eonothem of Asia